India participated at the 2018 Summer Youth Olympics in Buenos Aires, Argentina from 6 October to 18 October 2018. India managed their best ever medal haul of the Youth Olympics in this edition. Among the 206 participating nations, India ranked 17th on the medals tally.

Jeremy Lalrinnunga won India's first ever Youth Olympics gold medal.
Tababi Devi won the first ever Youth Olympics medal for India in Judo and later also won a silver in the mixed team event under mixed-NOCs.
Manu Bhaker became the first Indian girl to win a Youth Olympics gold medal and later also won a silver in the mixed 10 metre air pistol event under mixed-NOCs
Both Boys' and Girls' Hockey 5s teams won silver medals in their debut.

Medalists

Medals awarded to participants of Mixed-NOC teams are represented in (italics). These medals are not counted towards the Individual NOC Medal tally.

Competitors 
India placed 46 athletes in 13 sports with 36 events, its largest contingent till now. India marks its debut in field hockey 5s and sport climbing at the Youth Olympics. The contingent includes ISSF senior and junior world cup champion Manu Bhaker, Commonwealth Games medallist shooter Mehuli Ghosh, ISSF senior world champion Saurabh Choudary, world youth boxing champion Jyoti Gulia and world youth silver medalist Jeremy Lalrinunga in weightlifting.

Archery 

India qualified two archers based on its performance at the Asian Continental Qualification Tournament.

Athletics

Track and Road events

Field events

Badminton 

India qualified two players based on the Badminton Junior World Rankings.

Boxing 

India qualified one boxer based on its performance at the 2017 Youth Women’s World Boxing Championships.

Field hockey 

India qualified 2 teams (Men and Women) based on its performance at the 2018 Youth Olympics Qualifiers.
Both teams won silver medals.

Boy's 5s 
Team: Prashant Chauhan,  Shivam Anand, Rahul Rajbhar, Maninder Singh, Sanjay Kumar, Sudeep Chirmako, Pawan Malik, Rabichandra Moirangathem, Vivek Prasad

Preliminary round 
Pool B

Final round 
Quarterfinal

Semifinal

Gold medal match

Girl's 5s 
Team: Salima Tete, Reet, Khushboo Khan, Ishika Chaudhary, Mumtaz Khan, Baljeet Kaur, Chetna Rathi, Bichu Devi Kharibam, Lalremsiami

Preliminary round 
Pool A

Final round 
Quarterfinal

Semifinal

Gold medal match

Judo

Rowing 

India qualified one boat based on its performance at the 2018 Asian Youth Olympic Games Qualification Regatta.

Shooting 

India qualified four sport shooters based on its performance at the 2017 Asian Championships.
Individual

Mixed

Sport climbing 

India qualified one sport climber based on its performance at the 2017 Asian Youth Sport Climbing Championships.

Swimming

Table tennis 

India qualified one table tennis player based on its performance at the Road to Buenos Aires (Asia) series in Thailand  and one more in the form of Archana Kamath at the Road to Buenos Aires (Oceania) in the Cook Islands.

Weightlifting 

India qualified two athletes based on its performance at the 2018 Asian Youth Championships.

Wrestling 
India qualified two athletes based on its performance at the 2018 Asian Cadet Championships.

References

2018 in Indian sport
Nations at the 2018 Summer Youth Olympics
India at the Youth Olympics